The United States Post Office Knickerbocker Station, originally known as "Station B",  is a historic post office building located on East Broadway in Manhattan, New York City. It was built in 1935–37, and designed by consulting architect William Dewey Foster for the Office of the Supervising Architect of the United States Department of the Treasury.  The building is a two to three story, brick building with a mansard roof and granite trim in the Colonial Revival style.  The main entrance features a three bay wide pavilion topped by a pediment.

The building was listed on the National Register of Historic Places in 1989.

References
Notes

External links

Knickerbocker Station
Government buildings completed in 1937
Colonial Revival architecture in New York City
1937 establishments in New York (state)